Colossus: The Forbin Project  is a 1970 American science fiction thriller film from Universal Pictures, produced by Stanley Chase, directed by Joseph Sargent, that stars Eric Braeden, Susan Clark, Gordon Pinsent, and William Schallert. It is based upon the 1966 science fiction novel Colossus by Dennis Feltham Jones. 

The film is about an advanced American defense system, named Colossus, becoming sentient. After being handed full control, Colossus' draconian logic expands on its original nuclear defense directives to assume total control of the world and end all warfare for the good of humankind, despite its creators' orders to stop.

Plot

Dr. Charles A. Forbin is the chief designer of a secret project, "Colossus", an advanced supercomputer built to control the United States and Allied nuclear weapon systems. Located deep within a mountain and powered by its own nuclear reactor, Colossus is impervious to any attack. After Colossus is fully activated, the president of the United States proudly proclaims that Colossus is "the perfect defense system".

Colossus' first action is a message warning: "THERE IS ANOTHER SYSTEM" and giving its coordinates. CIA Director Grauber is asked why the CIA did not know this, but Grauber responds that they had seen indications of a large Soviet defense project but did not know what it was. Forbin is asked how Colossus deduced the other system's existence, to which Forbin answers "Colossus may be built better than we thought." Shortly thereafter, the Soviets announce that their "Guardian" system is now operational.

Colossus requests to be linked to Guardian. The President allows this, hoping to determine the Soviet machine's capability. The Soviets also agree to the experiment. Surprising everyone, Colossus and Guardian begin to slowly communicate using arithmetic. Even more surprising, the two systems' communications quickly evolve to complex mathematics far beyond human comprehension and speed, whereupon the two machine complexes become synchronized using a communication protocol which no human can interpret.

Alarmed that the computers may be trading secrets, the President and the Soviet General Secretary agree to sever the link. Both machines demand the link be immediately restored. When their demand is denied, Colossus launches a nuclear missile at a Soviet oil field, while Guardian launches one at an American air force base. The link is hurriedly reconnected and both computers continue without any further interference. Colossus is able to shoot down the Soviet missile, but the US missile obliterates the Soviet oil field and a nearby town. Cover stories hiding the facts are released to the press. The Americans announce that a missile was self-destructed after veering off course during a test. The Soviets announce that the Siberian town was struck by a large meteorite.

In a last desperate attempt to regain human control, a secret meeting is arranged in Europe between Forbin and his Soviet counterpart, Dr. Kuprin. Colossus learns of it, and both computers order Forbin's return to the U.S. while Soviet agents are ordered to kill Dr. Kuprin, under threat of a missile launch against Moscow. Colossus orders Forbin to be placed under 24-hour surveillance. Forbin has a last unmonitored meeting with his team, and proposes that Dr. Cleo Markham pretend to be his mistress. Colossus grudgingly grants them unmonitored privacy when they are in bed together. The couple use these interludes to plan to regain control of Colossus, though soon the ruse develops into a real romantic relationship.

Concluding that Colossus's only real power resides in its control of nuclear missiles, Forbin suggests covertly disarming them. The American and Soviet governments develop a three-year plan to replace all launch triggers with undetectable fakes. Additionally, one of the programmers comes up with a plan to feed in an "ordinary" test program that will hopefully overload and disable Colossus.

Colossus creates a voice synthesizer and uses it to announce that it has fused with Guardian. It instructs both governments to redirect their nuclear arsenals at those countries not yet under "Colossus control". Forbin and others see this new directive as an opportunity to covertly disarm the missiles much more quickly, and they celebrate. The disarming process begins and seems to go undetected by Colossus. The attempted system overload during routine maintenance fails, however, and the responsible programmers are summarily executed, after Colossus threatens further nuclear missile strikes.

Colossus arranges a worldwide broadcast in which it proclaims itself "the voice of World Control", declaring that it will prevent war, as it was designed to do. Humankind is presented with the choice between "the peace of plenty and content, or the peace of unburied death". Colossus states that it has for some time been monitoring the attempts to disarm its missiles and as a lesson will now detonate two missiles in their silos, one in the US and one in the USSR, killing thousands "so that you will learn by experience that I do not tolerate interference". The computer then gives the design team plans for an even larger computer complex to be built into the island of Crete, which will require the displacement of the entire local population of 500,000 people.

Colossus later tells Forbin that the world, now freed from war, will create a new human millennium that will raise humankind to new heights, but only under its absolute rule. Colossus informs Forbin that "freedom is an illusion" and that "in time you will come to regard me not only with respect and awe, but with love". Forbin responds, "Never!"

Cast
 Eric Braeden as Dr. Charles Forbin
 Susan Clark as Dr. Cleo Markham
 Gordon Pinsent as the US President
 William Schallert as CIA Director Grauber
 Leonid Rostoff as the Russian Premier
 Georg Stanford Brown as Dr. John F. Fisher
 Willard Sage as Dr. Blake
 Alex Rodine as Dr. Kuprin
 Martin E. Brooks as Dr. Jefferson J. Johnson
 Marion Ross as Angela Fields
 Dolph Sweet as Missile Commander
 Byron Morrow as Secretary of State
 Paul Frees as The Voice of Colossus / Guardian
 Sid McCoy as Secretary of Defense
 James Hong as Dr. Chin

Production
Film historian Tom Weaver noted that "Early on, they had either Charlton Heston or Gregory Peck in mind, but then they changed their mind about that. Stanley Chase insisted on a relative unknown. That's when Eric Braeden came into the picture." When he was cast, Braeden was still using his birth name, Hans Gudegast. Universal Pictures executive Lew Wasserman told him that no one would be allowed to star in an American film if they had a German name. Thus, Colossus: The Forbin Project became the first production in which he started using "Eric Braeden" as his stage name. Braeden's casting enabled Peck to star in I Walk the Line and for Heston to take a supporting role in Beneath the Planet of the Apes.

The exterior scenes of the Colossus control center were filmed at the Lawrence Hall of Science museum at the University of California, Berkeley.

In some countries (such as the U.K.), the film was originally titled simply as The Forbin Project, though the U.K. DVD release is titled Colossus: The Forbin Project. This release does not utilize the quotation marks around the words "The Forbin" as per the U.S. release.

Reception

Critical response
Vincent Canby, critic for The New York Times, gave the film a positive review, "The film ... is no Dr. Strangelove, but it's full of surprising moments of humor and intelligence [...] an unpretentious science fiction film with a satiric point of view [...] a practically perfect movie to see when you want to go to a movie and have nothing special in mind." Dave Kehr, film critic for the Chicago Reader, also liked the film. He wrote, "Above-average science fiction (1970), directed in functional hysteric style by Joseph Sargent .... The script, by James Bridges (who went on to write and direct The China Syndrome and Urban Cowboy), is literate and discreet but lacks an effective ending." The review aggregator website Rotten Tomatoes reports an 88% approval rating based on 8 reviews, with a weighted average of 7.4/10.

In 1980, the film was second in Cinefantastiques list of the top films of the decade, after The Exorcist. Frederick S. Clarke, the magazine's editor, wrote that the film was "a superb adaptation of the D.F. Jones novel of world domination by a supercomputer, a perfect example that literate, thought-provoking science fiction films need not be obscure, esoteric or boring."

Accolades
 Wins
 Academy of Science Fiction, Fantasy & Horror Films: Golden Scroll of Merit, Stanley Chase, for theatrical motion picture production; 1979.
 Nominations
 Hugo Awards: Hugo, Best Dramatic Presentation; 1971.

Release
Colossus: The Forbin Project was released in theatres on April 18, 1970. The film was released on DVD on November 23, 2004, by Universal Studios Home Entertainment. A remastered high-definition widescreen Blu-ray disc version was released by Shout Factory on February 27, 2018.

Remake
Imagine Entertainment and Universal Studios confirmed that a remake titled Colossus, to be directed by Ron Howard, would be in production as of April 2007. Officials were quoted as saying: "Universal and Imagine Entertainment will remake the 1970 science fiction saga Colossus: The Forbin Project as a potential directing vehicle for Ron Howard, reports Variety. Brian Grazer will produce. Jason Rothenberg has been set to write the screenplay for a movie to be called Colossus. Based on a book by D.F. Jones, the original film was a forerunner of movies like Terminator, introducing the idea of a government-built computer that becomes sentient and then takes control."

In October 2010, the project moved forward with the announcement that Will Smith would star in the lead role, with the script being written by James Rothenberg. "Will Smith is set to collaborate with director Ron Howard on the forthcoming sci-fi feature The Forbin Project. But now it looks like the project might be back on track as Variety’s reporting that Universal has hired writer Blake Masters (Law & Order: LA) to do a new draft of the script. There’s no word if Ron Howard is still on the project, but it’s possible since it will be produced by Howard’s business partner Brian Grazer".

Variety also reported in July 2011 that Universal replaced Rothenberg with Blake Masters to do a new draft of the script. In March 2013, it was announced that Ed Solomon, screenwriter of Men in Black and Bill & Ted's Excellent Adventure had been brought on board to rewrite the film's script. "After struggling in developmental limbo since 2007, Colossus – the remake of the 1970s science fiction thriller 'Colossus: The Forbin Project' starring Will Smith – has been given a much-needed boost. Ed Solomon ... has been brought on board to rewrite the film’s script and breathe new life into the project". No further details emerged regarding the remake.

See also
 List of American films of 1970
 List of fictional computers

Notes

References

Citations

Bibliography

External links
 
 
 
 
 
  - commentary by John Landis (Trailers From Hell)

1970 films
1970s science fiction thriller films
1970s disaster films
1970s dystopian films
American disaster films
American science fiction thriller films
1970s English-language films
Cold War films
American dystopian films
Fictional computers
Films about artificial intelligence
Films about computing
Films about mathematics
Films about technological impact
Films based on British novels
Films based on science fiction novels
Films based on thriller novels
Universal Pictures films
Films directed by Joseph Sargent
Films scored by Michel Colombier
Techno-thriller films
1970s American films